Gábor Babos (born 24 October 1974) is a Hungarian football goalkeeper. He is also currently the goalkeeper coach of NAC Breda.

Babos has previously played for MTK Hungária, Feyenoord and NEC before returning to NAC Breda in the summer of 2013. He was also a member of the Hungarian national team for twelve years.

On 16 December 2022, he was named for the squad for NAC, although he retired 5 years ago.

Coaching career
After his career, Babos started working as a goalkeeper coach for the youth teams of NAC Breda. In November 2015, he became manager of the Roosendaal amateur club BSC, where his son, Dani, played. Though his new manager job, he still continued as a youth goalkeeper coach at NAC.

In March 2018, Babos joined NEC, replacing Wilfried Brookhuis, who was hit by an Intracerebral hemorrhage.

On 16 December 2022, Babos was registered to the NAC Breda squad as an emergency backup due to the illness of their 3 starting goalkeepers.

Honours 

MTK Hungária FC

 Hungarian League: 1997, 1999
 Runner-up: 2000
 Hungarian Cup: 1997, 1998, 2000Personal Honours

 Dutch Football Goalkeeper of the Year: 2004, 2008

References

External links
 Voetbal International profile 
 

1974 births
Living people
People from Sopron
Hungarian footballers
Association football goalkeepers
MTK Budapest FC players
NAC Breda players
Feyenoord players
NEC Nijmegen players
Eredivisie players
Hungary international footballers
Hungarian expatriate footballers
Expatriate footballers in the Netherlands
Hungarian expatriate sportspeople in the Netherlands
Sportspeople from Győr-Moson-Sopron County